The Jones oxidation is an organic reaction for the oxidation of primary and secondary alcohols to carboxylic acids and ketones, respectively. It is named after its discoverer, Sir Ewart Jones. The reaction was an early method for the oxidation of alcohols.  Its use has subsided because milder, more selective reagents have been developed, e.g. Collins reagent.

Jones reagent is a solution prepared by dissolving chromium trioxide in aqueous sulfuric acid.  To effect a Jones oxidation, this acidic mixture is then added to an acetone solution of the substrate. Alternatively, potassium dichromate can be used in place of chromium trioxide. The oxidation is very rapid and quite exothermic.  Yields are typically high. The reagent is convenient and cheap. However, Cr(VI) compounds are carcinogenic, which deters the use of this methodology.

Stoichiometry and mechanism
Jones reagent will convert primary and secondary alcohols to aldehydes and ketones, respectively. Depending on the reaction conditions, the aldehydes may then be converted to carboxylic acids. For oxidations to the aldehydes and ketones, two equivalents of chromic acid oxidize three equivalents of the alcohol:
 2 HCrO4− + 3 RR'C(OH)H + 8 H+ + 4 H2O → 2 [Cr(H2O)6]3+ + 3 RR'CO

For oxidation of primary alcohols to carboxylic acids, 4 equivalents of chromic acid oxidize 3 equivalents of the alcohol. The aldehyde is an intermediate.
4 HCrO4− + 3 RCH2OH + 16 H+ + 11 H2O → 4 [Cr(H2O)6]3+ + 3 RCOOH
The inorganic products are green, characteristic of chromium(III) aquo complexes.

Like many other oxidations of alcohols by metal oxides, the reaction proceeds via the formation of a mixed chromate ester: These esters have the formula CrO3(OCH2R)−
CrO3(OH)− + RCH2OH → CrO3(OCH2R)− + H2O
Like conventional esters, the formation of this chromate ester is accelerated by the acid.  These esters can be isolated when the alcohol is tertiary because these lack the α hydrogen that would be lost to form the carbonyl.  For example, using tert-butyl alcohol, one can isolate tert-butyl chromate ((CH3)3CO)2CrO2), which is itself a good oxidant.

For those structures with hydrogen alpha to the oxygen, the chromate esters degrade, releasing the carbonyl product and an ill-defined Cr(IV) product:
CrO3(OCH2R)− → CrO2OH− + O=CHR
The deuterated alcohols HOCD2R oxidize about six times slower than the undeuterated derivatives. This large kinetic isotope effect shows that the C–H (or C–D) bond breaks in the rate-determining step. 

The reaction stoichiometry implicates the Cr(IV) species "CrO2OH−", which comproportionates with the chromic acid to give a Cr(V) oxide, which also functions as an oxidant for the alcohol.

The oxidation of the aldehydes is proposed to proceed via the formation of hemiacetal-like intermediates, which arise from the addition of the O3CrO-H− bond across the C=O bond.

The reagent rarely oxidizes unsaturated bonds.

Illustrative reactions and applications
It remains useful in organic synthesis. A variety of spectroscopic techniques, including Infrared spectroscopy, can be used to monitor the progress of a Jones oxidation reaction.  At one time the Jones oxidation was used in breathalyzers.

Related processes
  
The principal reagents are Collins reagent, PDC, and PCC.  These reagents represent improvements over inorganic chromium(VI) reagents such as Jones reagent.

Historical references

References

Organic oxidation reactions
Name reactions